Archie Reese (born February 4, 1956) is a former American football defensive tackle who played six seasons in the National Football League (NFL), mainly for the San Francisco 49ers. He also played with the Pittsburgh Maulers of the USFL.  Currently Residing in Palmetto, Florida.

1956 births
Living people
American football defensive linemen
Clemson Tigers football players
San Francisco 49ers players
Los Angeles Raiders players
Pittsburgh Maulers players
People from Palmetto, Florida
Players of American football from South Carolina
People from Mayesville, South Carolina